Niles Chapman Jordan (December 1, 1925 – March 15, 2008) was an American professional baseball player, a pitcher who appeared in Major League Baseball during the 1951 and 1952 seasons for the Philadelphia Phillies and Cincinnati Reds.

A native of Lyman, Washington, Jordan attended Sedro-Woolley High School before enlisting the United States Navy upon graduation in 1943. He served on the destroyer USS Bennett, taking part at the battles of Iwo Jima and Okinawa. On April 7, 1945, Jordan survived a hit from a Japanese kamikaze fighter on the Bennett.

Jordan later pitched for the Sedro-Woolley in the local city league and in 1948 was signed by the Philadelphia Phillies. He was sent to the Klamath Falls Gems of the Far West League where, in 1949, he finished with a 19–7 mark and a 4.35 ERA. In 1950 he was promoted to the Terre Haute Phillies of the Three-I League where he was 17–6, and then enjoyed his best season with Wilmington of the Interstate League in 1951, going 21–3 with 20 complete games (including two one-hitters) and earned a late-season call-up to Philadelphia. Before the 1952 season, he was obtained by the Cincinnati Reds along with Eddie Pellagrini, Andy Seminick and Dick Sisler in the same transaction that brought Connie Ryan, Smoky Burgess and Howie Fox to the Phillies.

In a two-season career, Jordan posted a 2–4 record with a 4.19 ERA in eight appearances, including a shutout, giving up 22 runs (two unearned) on 49 hits and 11 walks while striking out 13 in 43.0 innings of work. 
 
Following his baseball career, Jordan returned to Sedro Woolley, Washington, just miles from his birthplace, where he worked in the lumber industry for many years. He died in the Life Care Center of Skagit Valley at the age of 82.

References

External links

Retrosheet
Skagit Valley Herald

1925 births
2008 deaths
United States Navy personnel of World War II
Baltimore Orioles (IL) players
Baseball players from Washington (state)
Cincinnati Reds players
Klamath Falls Gems players
Major League Baseball pitchers
People from Skagit County, Washington
Philadelphia Phillies players
Portland Beavers players
Richmond Virginians (minor league) players
Rochester Red Wings players
Terre Haute Phillies players
Toronto Maple Leafs (International League) players
Tulsa Oilers (baseball) players
United States Navy sailors
Wilmington Blue Rocks (1940–1952) players